Gilles Boeuf (born November 6, 1950, in Paimbœuf) is a French biologist, who served as president of the National Museum of Natural History, France from February 2009 to August 2015. He was a professor at Pierre and Marie Curie University. He was knighted with the French Order of Merit in 2009, and the Legion of Honour in 2013.

References 

1950 births
Living people
French biologists